Foster Vincent Brown (December 24, 1852 – March 26, 1937) was an American politician and attorney who served a U.S. Representative for Tennessee's 3rd congressional district.

Early life and education
Born near Sparta, Tennessee, Brown was the son of Joseph and Martha Thankful Mitchell Brown, and attended the common schools. He graduated from Burritt College in Spencer, Tennessee, in 1871 and from the Cumberland School of Law in Lebanon, Tennessee, in 1873.

Career 
He was admitted to the bar and commenced practice in Jasper, Tennessee, in 1874.

Brown served as delegate to the Republican National Conventions in 1884, 1896, 1900, and 1916, and as attorney general of the fourth judicial district from 1886 to 1894. He moved to Chattanooga in May 1890 and continued the practice of law.

Elected as a Republican to the Fifty-fourth Congress representing Tennessee's 3rd congressional district Brown served from March 4, 1895 to March 3, 1897.  He declined to be a candidate for renomination in 1896.

After leaving Congress Brown resumed the practice of law until he was appointed attorney general of Puerto Rico on May 10, 1910. He served in that position until April 20, 1912, when he resigned. He then resumed the practice of law in Chattanooga until his death.

Personal life
Brown was the father of Joseph Edgar Brown.

Brown died on March 26, 1937, at the age of 84, in Chattanooga, Tennessee. He is interred at Forest Hills Cemetery.

References

External links

1852 births
1937 deaths
Republican Party members of the United States House of Representatives from Tennessee
People from Sparta, Tennessee
Politicians from Chattanooga, Tennessee
Republican Party (Puerto Rico) politicians
People from Jasper, Tennessee
Burritt College alumni
19th-century American lawyers
20th-century American lawyers
19th-century American politicians
20th-century American politicians